Athletics at the 1972 Summer Paralympics consisted of 73 events, 37 for men and 36 for women.

Participating nations

Medal table

Medal summary

Men's events

Women's events

References 

 

 
1972 Summer Paralympics events
1972
Paralympics